The Poker Nations Cup is an international poker tournament, televised on Channel 4 from March 2006 onwards.

The series is commentated by Jesse May and Barny Boatman. Padraig Parkinson covered for Boatman in preliminary match 2.

The series was filmed in Cardiff, Wales. Thomas Kremser was the tournament director, and the dealers were Marina Kremser and Stevie Pollak.

The event in 2006 was sponsored by 888.com. In 2007 888.com has been replaced by Partypoker as main sponsors. The event will also be televised on Channel 4.

Format
Six nations compete in the series, with six members to each team. Each team has a captain and an internet qualifier.

The captain chooses one player from the six available to compete in each of the six preliminary tournaments (each player on the team plays once, and once only.)

Points are awarded for the finishing position of each player in each preliminary event. These points are totalled and used to calculate chips in the Grand Final. Points are awarded as follows:

1st: 10 points
2nd: 7 points
3rd: 5 points
4th: 3 points
5th: 2 points
6th: 1 point

Team captains can choose to substitute team members during the Grand Final, where the winning team receives $100,000.

(NB: As members of a nation's team never face other members of the same team, there is no possibility of collusion, as is possible in other team-format poker tournaments.)

Teams
NB: The flags within this article show the country the player is representing. e.g.: below Scott Gray is identified with the Irish flag as that is the country he is representing, despite Gray being born in Canada.

1: denotes Team Captain
2: denotes online qualifier

Results

Preliminary rounds

Grand Final
Team captains chose three players to compete in the Grand Final. Only one player started, who then had to be substituted by the end of the third level. The second player had to be substituted for the third player at the end of the sixth level. Blind levels ran twice as long as in the preliminary heats.

Team captains were also entitled to call a 60-second time-out with any player in their team once per game.

The Grand Final's television broadcast spanned over two episodes.

2007 Event
The 2007 event aired in March 2007 featuring teams representing Great Britain, USA, Germany, Sweden, Denmark and the Netherlands with the winning team receiving $100,000 prize money.

External links
Article by Joe Beevers

Television shows about poker
Poker tournaments in Europe